Karaitivu is a coastal village situated in the Calpentyn peninsula of the Puttalam District and is located 12 km away from Puttalam, the district headquarters.

References

Populated places in North Western Province, Sri Lanka
Populated places in Puttalam District